Cartosat-2C is an Earth observation satellite in a Sun-synchronous orbit (SSO) and is a fifth flight unit of Cartosat series of satellites. It is a geostationary satellite and appears stationary over a place on the earth. The satellite is built at space application centre Ahmedabad, launched and maintained by the Indian Space Research Organisation (ISRO). It was launched on 22 June 2016.

Instruments 
The CartoSat-2C carries a panchromatic camera (PAN) capable of taking black-and-white pictures in the visible region of electromagnetic spectrum. It also carries a High-Resolution Multi-Spectral (HRMX) radiometer which is a type of optical imager. The satellite has a spatial resolution of 0.6 metres. CartoSat-2C is also capable of capturing minute long video of a fixed spot as well, Event Monitoring camera (EvM) for frequent high-resolution land observation of selected areas.

Launch 
The satellite launch was originally planned for 20 June 2016, however it was delayed twice due to a gas leakage. It was launched on 22 June 2016 from the second pad of the Satish Dhawan Space Centre. The minisatellites LAPAN-A3, BIROS, and SkySat Gen2-1, microsatellites GHGSat-D, and M3MSat, and nanosatellites Swayam, and SathyabamaSat, and 12 Flock-2P Dove nanosatellites were launched along with CartoSat-2C.

See also 

 List of Indian satellites

References 

Cartosat
Spacecraft launched by India in 2016
Spacecraft launched by PSLV rockets